David Ricketts may refer to:

 Dave Ricketts (1935-2008), American baseball player
 David Ricketts (cyclist) (1920–1996), British cyclist
 David Ricketts (musician) (born 1953), American musician and record producer